The 2013 AFC Futsal Club Championship was the 4th AFC Futsal Club Championship.It was held in Nagoya, Japan between 27 Aug and 1 Sep, 2013.

Bid process 
Japan beat bids from, Iran, and Uzbekistan.

Draw 
The draw for the finals of the AFC Futsal Club Championship Japan 2013 will be held on Friday, June 14 and will take place at the Petaling Jaya Hilton Hotel in Malaysia. Eight teams are in the fray including host club Nagoya Oceans and defending champions Giti Pasand Isfahan

The 8 teams were drawn in two groups, each group with four teams.

Qualification 

The national league champions of the three best placed teams in the 2012 Championship received a bye to the final as well as the host nation's champion. The remaining four spots were decided in two Asian qualifying tournaments.

Venues

Group stage

Group A 

 The standings are based on points, head-to-head, goal-difference and number of goals of the teams tied

Group B

Knockout stage

Semi-finals

Third place play-off

Final

Awards 

 Most Valuable Player
  Suphawut Thueanklang
 Top Scorer
  Kaoru Morioka (8 goals)
 Fair-Play Award
  Shenzhen Nanling

Final standing

Top scorers

References

External links 
 Official site

  
AFC Futsal Club Championship seasons
Futsal
Club
International futsal competitions hosted by Japan